Daniel Austen Jodah (born March 27, 1995) is a soccer player who plays for Sigma FC in League1 Ontario. Born in Canada, he represented Guyana internationally.

Career

Youth
He began playing youth soccer with Erin Mills SC and later played with Woodbridge Strikers.

He played for the Ontario provincial program from U14 to U16. In 2011, he played in an exhibition match against the TFC U17 team, and afterwards was invited to trial and later joined the Toronto FC Academy.

College
In 2013, he began playing for the Marshall University Thundering Herd. In his sophomore season, he was named to the All-Conference USA Second Team.

Club
In 2014, he played for Toronto FC III in League1 Ontario and in 2015, he played for them in the Premier Development League. He was named one of the Top 15 prospects to watch from the 2015 PDL season.

In 2017, he played for Sigma FC in League1 Ontario, scoring 4 goals in 15 games. In 2018, he scored 2 goals in 9 league appearances, and also played in 3 playoff games.

In 2018, he participated in the Open Trials for the new Canadian Premier League, being one of the 56 players of the over 200 participants who were invited to the second trial.

In 2021, he played for Scrosoppi FC, making nine appearances.

In 2022, he re-joined his former club Sigma FC.

International
In October 2010, he participated in a camp with the Canadian U15 team.

In November 2017, he was called up to the Guyana national team ahead of friendlies against Trinidad and Tobago and Indonesia. He made his debut on November 25 against Indonesia.

References

External links

1995 births
Living people
Association football midfielders
Sigma FC players
League1 Ontario players
Soccer players from Mississauga
Guyana international footballers
Canadian soccer players
Toronto FC players
Woodbridge Strikers players
USL League Two players
Marshall Thundering Herd men's soccer players
Scrosoppi FC players